Umayyad architecture developed in the Umayyad Caliphate between 661 and 750, primarily in its heartlands of Syria and Palestine. It drew extensively on the architecture of older Middle Eastern and Mediterranean civilizations including the Sassanian Empire and Byzantine Empire, but introduced innovations in decoration and form. Under Umayyad patronage, Islamic architecture began to mature and acquire traditions of its own, such as the introduction of mihrabs to mosques, a trend towards aniconism in decoration, and a greater sense of scale and monumentality compared to previous Islamic buildings. The most important examples of Umayyad architecture are concentrated in the capital of Damascus and the Greater Syria region, including the Dome of the Rock, the Great Mosque of Damascus, and secular buildings such as the Mshatta Palace and Qusayr 'Amra.

Historical background

The Umayyad Caliphate was established in 661 after Ali, the son-in-law of Muhammad, was murdered in Kufa. Muawiyah I, governor of Syria, became the first Umayyad caliph. The Umayyads made Damascus their capital. Under the Umayyads the Arab empire continued to expand, eventually extending to Central Asia and the borders of India in the east, Yemen in the south, the Atlantic coast of what is now Morocco and the Iberian Peninsula in the west. The Umayyads built new cities, often unfortified military camps that provided bases for further conquests. Wasit in present-day Iraq was the most important of these, and included a square Friday mosque with a hypostyle roof.

The empire was tolerant of existing customs in the conquered lands, creating resentment among those looking for a more theocratic state. In 747, a revolution began in Khorasan, in the east. By 750 the Umayyads had been overthrown by the Abbasids, who moved the capital to Mesopotamia. A branch of the Umayyad dynasty continued to rule in Iberia until 1051.

Characteristics

The Umayyads adopted the construction techniques of Byzantine architecture and Sasanian architecture. The reuse of elements from classical Roman and Byzantine art was particularly evident because political power and patronage was centered in Syria, formerly part of the Byzantine (Eastern Roman) Empire. Almost all monuments from the Umayyad period that have survived are in Syria and Palestine. They also often re-used existing buildings. There was some innovation in decoration and in types of building. A significant amount of experimentation occurred as Umayyad patrons recruited craftsmen from across the empire and architects were allowed, or even encouraged, to mix elements from different artistic traditions and to disregard traditional conventions and restraints.

Most buildings in Syria were of high quality ashlar masonry, using large tightly-joined blocks, sometimes with carving on the facade. Stone barrel vaults were only used to roof small spans. Wooden roofs were used for larger spans, with the wood in Syria brought from the forests of Lebanon. These roofs usually had shallow pitches and rested on wooden trusses. Wooden domes were constructed for Al-Aqsa Mosque and the Dome of the Rock, both in Jerusalem. Baked brick and mud brick were used in Mesopotamia, due to lack of stone. Where brick was used in Syria, the work was in the finer Mesopotamian style rather than the more crude Byzantine style.

Umayyad architecture is distinguished by the extent and variety of decoration, including mosaics, wall painting, sculpture and carved reliefs with Islamic motifs. The Umayyads used local workers and architects. Some of their buildings cannot be distinguished from those of the previous regime. However, in many cases eastern and western elements were combined to give a distinctive new Islamic style. For example, the walls at Qasr Mshatta are built from cut stone in the Syrian manner, the vaults are Mesopotamian in design and Coptic and Byzantine elements appear in the decorative carving. While figural scenes were notably present in monuments like Qusayr 'Amra, non-figural decoration and more abstract scenes became highly favoured, especially in religious architecture. The horseshoe arch appears for the first time in Umayyad architecture, later to evolve to its most advanced form in al-Andalus.

Dome of the Rock 

The sanctuary of the Dome of the Rock, standing on the Haram al-Sharif (Temple Mount) in Jerusalem, is the oldest surviving major Islamic building. It is also an exceptional monument within the context of Umayyad and wider Islamic architecture, in terms of both its form and function. It was not a mosque but rather a shrine or commemorative monument, likely built to honour ancient religious associations with the site such as the creation of Adam and Abraham's sacrifice. It acquired further layers of meaning over time and became most commonly associated with the "Night Journey" of Muhammad. It was also built as a visual symbol of Islamic dominance and its high dome was likely designed to compete for prominence with the dome of the nearby Christian Church of the Holy Sepulchre.

The building followed the design of a Byzantine martyrium. It consists of an octagonal structure, inside of which is another octagon formed by piers and columns, and finally an inner circular ring of piers and columns at the center. Although the exterior of the building is now covered in 16th-century Ottoman tiles, both the exterior and interior were originally decorated with lavish mosaics, with the interior mosaics still mostly preserved today. The mosaics are entirely aniconic, a characteristic that would continue in later Islamic decoration. The imagery consists of vegetal motifs and other objects such as vases and chalices. The building was also decorated with long inscriptions containing Qur'anic inscriptions chosen to emphasize the superiority of Islam over the preceding Abrahamic religions.

Mosques

General development 
The earliest mosques were often makeshift. In Iraq, they evolved from square prayer enclosures. The ruins of two large Umayyad mosques have been found in Samarra, Iraq. Both had hypostyle designs, with roofs supported by elaborately designed columns.

In Syria, the Umayyads preserved the overall concept of a court surrounded by porticos, with a deeper sanctuary, that had been developed in Medina. Rather than make the sanctuary a hypostyle hall, as was done in Iraq, they divided it into three aisles. This may have been derived from church architecture, although all the aisles were the same width. In Syria, churches were converted to mosques by blocking up the west door and making entrances in the north wall. The direction of prayer was south towards Mecca, so the long axis of the building was at right angles to the direction of prayer.

The Umayyads introduced a transept that divided the prayer room along its shorter axis. They also added the mihrab to mosque design. The Prophet's Mosque in Medina built by al-Walid I had the first mihrab, a niche on the qibla wall, which seems to have represented the place where the Prophet stood when leading prayer. This almost immediately became a standard feature of all mosques. The minbar also began appearing in mosques in cities or administrative centers, a throne-like structure with regal rather than religious connotations.

Great Mosque of Damascus 
The Great Mosque of Damascus was built by the caliph al-Walid I around 706–715. Some scholars have argued that the first Umayyad version of the al-Aqsa Mosque in Jerusalem, begun by Abd al-Malik (al-Walid's father) and now replaced by later constructions, had a layout very similar to the current Umayyad Mosque in Damascus and that it probably served as a model for the latter. The layout remains largely unchanged and some of the decoration has been preserved. The Great Mosque was built within the area of a Roman temenos from the first century. The exterior walls of the earlier building, once a temple of Jupiter and later a church, were retained, although the southern entrances were walled up and new entrances made in the north wall.  The interior was completely rebuilt.

The Damascus mosque is rectangular, with a covered area  and a courtyard  surrounded by a portico. The prayer hall has three aisles parallel to the qibla wall, a common arrangement in Umayyad mosques in Syria. The court holds a small octagonal building on columns. This was the treasury of the Muslims, perhaps only symbolic, which was traditionally kept in a town's main mosque. The mosque was richly decorated with mosaics and marble. A rich composition of marble paneling covered the lower walls, though only minor examples of the original marbles have survived today near the east gate. The marble window grilles in the great mosque, which diffuse the light, are worked in patterns of interlocking circles and squares, precursors to the arabesque style that would become characteristic of Islamic decoration.

Vast portions of the mosque's walls were decorated with mosaics, of which some original fragments have survived, including some that depict the houses, palaces and river valley of Damascus. Byzantine artisans were reportedly employed to create them, and their imagery reflects a late Roman style. They reflected a wide variety of artistic styles used by mosaicists and painters since the 1st century CE, but the combined use of all these different styles in the same place was innovative at the time. Similar to the Dome of the Rock, built earlier by Abd al-Malik, vegetation and plants were the most common motif, but those of the Damascus mosque are more naturalistic. In addition to the large landscape depictions, a mosaic frieze with an intricate vine motif (referred to as the karma in Arabic historical sources) once ran around the walls of the prayer hall, above the level of the mihrab. The only notable omission is the absence of human and animal figures, which was likely a new restriction imposed by the Muslim patron. Scholars have long debated the meaning of the mosaic imagery. Some historical Muslim writers and some modern scholars have interpreted them as a representation of all the cities in the known world (or within the Umayyad Caliphate at the time), while other scholars interpret them as a depiction of Paradise.

Other mosques 
The Great Mosque of Damascus served as a model for later mosques. Similar layouts, scaled down, have been found in a mosque excavated in Tiberias, on the Sea of Galillee, and in a mosque in the palace of Khirbat al-Minya. The plan of the White Mosque at Ramla differs in shape, and the prayer hall is divided into only two aisles. This may be explained by construction of underground cisterns in the Abbasid period, causing the original structure to be narrowed.

The Mosque of Sidi Okba near Biskra (present-day Algeria) belongs to a large complex built around the tomb of the governor of Ifriqiya, 'Uqba ibn Nafi' (d. 683). This mosque is one of the oldest in North Africa, though it has been significantly modified in later periods. Its hypostyle layout resembles the early mosques of Medina, with seven naves running parallel to the qibla wall. This type of transverse configuration of the naves is reminiscent of Umayyad or early Medina mosques.

Desert palaces

The Umayyads are known for their desert palaces, some new and some adapted from earlier forts. The largest is Qasr al-Hayr al-Sharqi. The palaces were symbolically defended by walls, towers and gates.  In some cases the outside walls carried decorative friezes. The palaces would have a bath house, a mosque, and a main castle. The entrance to the castle would usually be elaborate. Towers along the walls would often hold apartments with three or five rooms. These rooms were simple, indicating they were little more than places to sleep. The palaces often had a second floor holding formal meeting rooms and official apartments.

The fortress-like appearance was misleading. Thus Qasr Kharana appears to have arrowslits, but these were purely decorative. The fortress-like plan was derived from Roman forts built in Syria, and construction mostly followed earlier Syrian methods with some Byzantine and Mesopotamian elements. The baths derive from Roman models, but had smaller heated rooms and larger ornate rooms that would presumably have been used for entertainment. The palaces had floor mosaics and frescoes or paintings on the walls, with designs that show both eastern and western influences. One fresco in the bath of Qusayr 'Amra depicts six kings. Inscriptions below in Arabic and Greek identify the first four as the rulers of Byzantium, Spain (at that time Visigothic), Persia and Abyssinia. Stucco sculptures were sometimes incorporated in the palace buildings.

A large walled enclosure  was presumably used to contain domestic animals. A walled madina, or city, contained a mosque, an olive oil press and six large houses. Nearby there was a bath and some simpler houses. According to an inscription dated 728, the caliph provided significant funding for its development. The settlement has a Late Antiquity Mediterranean design, but was soon modified. The madina originally had four gates, one in each wall, but three were soon walled up. The basic layout was formal, but the buildings often failed to comply with the plan. Most of the desert palaces were abandoned after the Umayyads fell from power, and remain as ruins.

Notable examples

Jordan
Qasr Amra
Qasr al Hallabat
Qasr al-Muwaqqar
Qasr al-Qastal
Qasr Hammam As Sarah 
Qasr of Jabal al-Qal'a, Amman
Qasr Kharana
Qasr Mshatta
Qasr Tuba

Syria
Al-Omari Mosque, Bosra
Great Mosque of Hama
Mabrak an-Naqah Mosque, Bosra
Qasr al-Hayr al-Gharbi
Qasr al-Hayr al-Sharqi
Umayyad Mosque, Damascus

Palestine and Israel
Al-Aqsa Mosque 
Al-Sinnabra
Dome of the Rock, Jerusalem
Dome of the Chain, Jerusalem
Khirbat al-Mafjar 
Khirbat al-Minya
White Mosque, Ramla

Algeria
Sidi Okba Mosque

Lebanon
City of Anjar, Lebanon

Saudi Arabia
Al-Masjid an-Nabawi

Tunisia
Great Mosque of Kairouan or Mosque of Uqba

Gallery

References

Notes

Citations

Sources

External links

 
7th-century architecture
8th-century architecture
Architecture in Syria
Architecture in the State of Palestine
Architecture in Jordan